Wolf Muser (23 October 1950 – 30 March 2022) was a German actor who played the role of Marcello Armonti on the NBC soap opera Santa Barbara in 1985. 

Prior to joining Santa Barbara, he also appeared as Kurt Voightlander on the CBS drama Capitol in 1983. In 2015, he played a septuagenarian Adolf Hitler in The Man in the High Castle, giving all the character's dialogue in German.

Muser died on 30 March 2022, at the age of 71.

Filmography (selection) 
 1975: Frozen Scream
 1982: Barbarosa
 1982: Yes, Giorgio
 1982: Kiss Me Goodbye
 1983: To Be or Not to Be
 1985: Santa Barbara (TV series)
 1990: Caged in Paradiso
 1995: Final Equinox
 1999: One Man’s Hero
 2002: Alias (TV series, 5 episodes)
 2015–2016: The Man in the High Castle (TV series)
 2016: Grimm (TV series)
 2017: Adam Ruins Everything

Videogames 
Wolf Muser was also known for his role as Dr. Klingmann in The Beast Within: A Gabriel Knight Mystery.

References

External links 
 

1950 births
2022 deaths
American male soap opera actors
German male television actors
People from Esslingen am Neckar